Venla Lehtonen (born 10 March 1995) is a Finnish biathlete. She competed in the 2018 Winter Olympics.

References

1995 births
Living people
Biathletes at the 2018 Winter Olympics
Finnish female biathletes
Olympic biathletes of Finland